Mike Hobson is a British television producer, known for his work on the BBC soap opera Doctors and the BBC drama series WPC 56.

Career
Hobson made his professional debut in the television industry in 1995 as a second assistant director in the BBC One medical drama series Dangerfield, which he also appeared in as an extra. Then in 1996, he became a location manager on Dangerfield, a position he also held on Dalziel and Pascoe. Then in 2000, he began working as a first assistant director on the BBC soap opera Doctors, a position he held until 2002, becoming a production manager on the programme in 2003, after which he became an associate producer followed by senior producer. In 2008, he was promoted to the series producer of Doctors, and won a shared award for Best Storyline at the 2009 British Soap Awards for Vivien March's Anita Carey) rape storyline, which was recognised again in 2018. Hobson was later promoted to executive producer, succeeding from Will Trotter. His first episode as executive producer aired on 17 June 2015, and he has since been responsible for castings of regulars including Ruhma Hanif (Bharti Patel), Penny Stevenson (Cerrie Burnell), Becky Clarke (Ali Bastian) and Bear Sylvester (Dex Lee).

Filmography

Awards and nominations

References

External links
 

BBC television producers
British television producers
Living people
Place of birth missing (living people)
Soap opera producers
Year of birth missing (living people)